Gaw Kush is a mountain of the Hindu Kush Range. The mountain is located in the province of Wardak, Afghanistan.

Hindu Kush
Two-thousanders of Afghanistan
Landforms of Maidan Wardak Province